Doris Auer (born 10 May 1971) is an Austrian pole vaulter. Her personal best is 4.40 metres (outdoors), achieved in September 2000 in Runaway Bay. This was the Austrian record until 2014 when Kira Grünberg broke the record jumping 4.45. Indoors Auer's best is 4.44 metres, achieved in Glasgow 2001. In the same year the former world champion Yelena Isinbayeva recorded 4.45 indoors.

After 2001 Auer's performance stagnated. In 2002, she resigned from competitive sports but continued to practise pole vaulting as a respectable amateur. Remarkable are her achievements in combining the career as an athlete with university studies and a profession literally simultaneously. She holds a university degree in Sports Sciences and History and works as a high school teacher in Vienna, Austria.

Achievements

External links

1971 births
Living people
Austrian female pole vaulters
Athletes (track and field) at the 2000 Summer Olympics
Olympic athletes of Austria
Universiade medalists in athletics (track and field)
Universiade bronze medalists for Austria
Medalists at the 1997 Summer Universiade